Elizabeth Sabina Franklyn (born 15 September 1954) is an English actress, and the daughter of William Franklyn and Margo Johns.

Franklyn attended the independent Queen's Gate School and acted on stage with repertory theatres before her television appearances.

She starred in the ITV sitcoms Keep It in the Family and Full House and was also in the final episode of Fawlty Towers, as well as episodes of When the Boat Comes In, All Creatures Great and Small, Terry and June and Boon. She has also guest-starred in the Doctor Who audio dramas, Bang-Bang-a-Boom! and Situation Vacant.

In November 2009, she played the role of Eve Wilson in Coronation Street.

TV and filmography

External links

 

1954 births
Living people
English television actresses
20th-century English actresses
21st-century English actresses
Actresses from London
English stage actresses